Vasilissa may refer to:

Vasilissa (child martyr)
Vasilissa (phasmid), a genus  of the Acanthoxylini tribe of stick insects
Alternative spelling of Vasilisa (name)
Alternative spelling of Basilissa, a Greek title similar to "queen" of "empress"
Alternative spelling of Basilissa (name)
Vasilissa (album), a 2017 album by Eleni Foureira

See also
Vasilissa ergo gaude